Maccabi Ironi Amishav Petah Tikva is an Israeli football club based in the Amishav neighbourhood of Petah Tikva.It currently competes in Liga Alef South division, playing home matches at the Sportek Stadium in Kfar Sirkin.

History
Since the 1960s, the football club which have operated in the Amishav neighborhood was Hapoel Amishav Petah Tikva. however, they were folded after failed attempt of merging with other Petah Tikva clubs, Hapoel Mahane Yehuda and Beitar Petah Tikva. one season later, in 1997, Maccabi Amishav Petah Tikva was founded, and started in Liga Gimel, the lowest tier of Israeli football.

In the 2004–05 season, the club won Liga Gimel Sharon division, and promoted to Liga Bet, after 19 wins and one draw, scoring 88 goals and conceding 11. in their first season in Liga Bet, former Israeli top flight players, Liron Basis and Alon Mizrahi joined the club, and at the end of the season, Maccabi Amishav won Liga Bet South A division, and made another successive promotion, this time to Liga Alef. the club played two seasons in Liga Alef, and relegated back to Liga Bet at the 2007–08 season, after finished second bottom. in the following season in Liga Bet, the club finished second, and even though they lost in the promotion play-offs to the third bottom club in Liga Alef South, Hapoel Nahlat Yehuda, they were eventually promoted, as one spot in Liga Alef was vacated, after Hapoel Umm al-Fahm folded.

Following their return to Liga Alef, the club have also established a youth section.

Honours
Liga Bet South A:
2005–06
Liga Gimel Sharon:
2004–05

External links
Maccabi Ironi Amishav Petah Tikva Eli Israel Football Association

References
Interview with Amishav Petah Tikva chairman Avi Shitrit about everything from everything Doublepass, 2.7.2013 

Amishav Petah Tikva
Amishav Petah Tikva
Association football clubs established in 1997
Sport in Petah Tikva
1997 establishments in Israel